Ian Sartori (born 17 December 1958) is a former Australian rules footballer who played with St Kilda and Richmond in the Victorian Football League (VFL).

Sartori, who was recruited from Daylesford, played his football mostly from the half forward flanks. After starting his career at St Kilda, Sartori crossed to Richmond in 1982 and was a member of their losing VFL Grand Final team, which played against Carlton.

Sartori was also a district cricketer, playing 123 first XI matches for North Melbourne (and North Melbourne-Geelong) from 1976/77 to 1989/90.

References
Citations

Bibliography

Holmesby, Russell and Main, Jim (2007). The Encyclopedia of AFL Footballers. 7th ed. Melbourne: Bas Publishing.

1958 births
Living people
Australian rules footballers from Victoria (Australia)
St Kilda Football Club players
Richmond Football Club players